Phillip Martin Simms (born November 3, 1955) is an American former professional football player who was a quarterback for 15 years, spending his entire career with the New York Giants of the National Football League (NFL). He is currently a television sportscaster for the CBS network. After playing college football at Morehead State University, Simms was drafted in the first round by the New York Giants with the number seven selection overall in the 1979 NFL Draft. Simms was named Most Valuable Player (MVP) of Super Bowl XXI, after he led the Giants to a 39–20 victory over the Denver Broncos and set the record for highest completion percentage in a Super Bowl, completing 22 of 25 passes (88%), a record that still stands. He also was named to the Pro Bowl for his performances in the 1985 and 1993 seasons.

He finished his career with 33,462 passing yards and has since gone on to be a career broadcaster of NFL games—first as an analyst for ESPN, then as a in-game color commentator with NBC, and currently with CBS. He is the father of former NFL quarterback, assistant coach, and current NFL football analyst Chris Simms and former quarterback Matt Simms.

Early life

Simms was born in Springfield, Kentucky, on his grandfather's farm, a place now called Maple Hill Manor in Washington County, where he attended St. Dominic's Elementary. While in elementary school, his family moved to Louisville and he went to St. Rita Catholic grade school. Simms was the quarterback of the Trojans of Southern High School in Louisville and graduated in 1974.

College career
Simms chose to attend  NCAA Division II Morehead State of the Ohio Valley Conference in nearby Morehead.

The Morehead State Eagles ran a ball-control offense, and Simms' numbers were unspectacular—in his senior season he completed 92 of 173 passes for a 53.2% completion percentage and had six touchdown passes, 11 interceptions, and 1,229 yards. The Ohio Valley moved up to the new Division I-AA in 1978, but the Eagles went ; they failed to make the postseason during his college career. Simms finished with 409 completions in 835 attempts for a 48.9% completion percentage. He also totaled 32 touchdowns, 45 interceptions, and a school-record 5,545 yards.

Professional career

NFL Draft
Before the 1979 NFL Draft, new San Francisco 49ers head coach Bill Walsh flew to Morehead State with assistant coach Sam Wyche to work out Simms. Walsh was so impressed that he planned to draft Simms in the third round, preferring him over the quarterback they ultimately took, Joe Montana of Notre Dame. But the New York Giants decided to make Simms their first round pick (seventh overall) to the surprise of many. As Simms acknowledged, "most people have never heard of me." When Simms's name was announced by Commissioner Pete Rozelle in front of the audience at the draft in New York, his selection was booed loudly by the Giants fans in attendance. (He was the second quarterback taken; Jack Thompson of Washington State went to Cincinnati with the third overall pick.) Simms was not then happy being a Giant either, "All I was thinking was which teams I would rather play for—the Green Bay Packers, the Kansas City Chiefs, San Diego, San Francisco..." But he became popular with his teammates, who jokingly dubbed him "Prince Valiant" in his rookie training camp.

Rookie year
Simms won his first five starts of his rookie year in 1979; he was 6–4 as a starter, threw for 1,743 yards and 13 touchdown passes, and was named to the NFL All-Rookie Team. He was runner-up for Rookie of the Year, behind future teammate Ottis Anderson.

Early career: 1980–1986
Simms' next four years were marred by injuries and inconsistent play. He finished the 1980 season with 15 touchdowns and 19 interceptions, while completing a subpar 48.0% of his passes for 2,321 yards. In 1981, Simms threw for 2,031 yards, 11 touchdowns, and 9 interceptions on 54.4% completion percentage before suffering a separated shoulder in a November 15 loss to the Washington Redskins. With Simms out, the Giants went on a run led by Scott Brunner and advanced to the second round of the playoffs. Simms suffered a torn knee ligament in a preseason game against the New York Jets, preventing him from playing the entire 1982 season. Following the season, Ray Perkins resigned as head coach to take over the same position at the University of Alabama, and was replaced by the team's defensive coordinator Bill Parcells. In the coming years this change would prove crucial to the Giants and Simms.

One of Parcells first decisions as coach was to replace Simms as the starting quarterback with Brunner. Simms asked to be traded after the benching, but his request was ignored. During the sixth game of the Giants' 1983 Season, Simms came in to replace the struggling Brunner against the Philadelphia Eagles. On his third drive, Simms suffered a season-ending injury when the thumb on his throwing hand hit a player's helmet on his follow-through. The injury was reported as a dislocation, but according to the book, Simms to McConkey, written by Phil McConkey, Simms, and Dick Schaap, the injury was much more severe, with the thumb literally hanging off after impact, and the bone sticking out through the skin.

During his first few years on the team, Giants fans were merciless in their treatment of Simms, who they felt was a disappointment. He commented that his wife "had to sit up in the stands and listen to them cuss me." However, in 1984, after many seasons plagued by injuries and up-and-down play, Simms finally emerged as a team offensive leader. During his 1983 injury, offensive coordinator Ron Erhardt talked Simms into watching more game film, something he had not regularly done in college or the pros. He gained a better understanding of NFL defenses, his team's formations, and pass protection schemes, and improved his ability to audible at the line of scrimmage. He also changed his strength training regimen in an attempt to make his body more resistant to injury. He passed for 4,044 yards (second most in the National Football Conference (NFC), 22 touchdown passes, and led the Giants to a playoff berth.

He was voted to the Pro Bowl and named Pro Bowl MVP as he led the NFC to a comeback win over the American Football Conference (AFC) by throwing three touchdowns. In 1985, he passed for 3,829 yards, 22 touchdowns, and led the Giants to 10 victories, the most for a Giants team since 1963. In a game against the Cincinnati Bengals during the 1985 season, Simms passed for 513 yards—the fifth most passing yards in a single game in NFL history. In 1986, he passed for 3,487 yards and 21 touchdown passes during a season in which the Giants won 14 games. In week 11, he completed a desperate fourth-and-17 pass to Bobby Johnson late in the game to set up Raul Allegre's game-winning field goal, which gave the Giants a 22–20 victory over the Minnesota Vikings. Simms later commented:

On January 25, 1987, the Giants met the Denver Broncos in Super Bowl XXI. In the biggest game of his life, Simms had one of the finest performances in Super Bowl history. He completed 22 of 25 passes for 268 yards, setting Super Bowl records for consecutive completions (10), accuracy (88%), and passer rating (150.9). In addition, he threw 3 touchdown passes and his passer rating set an NFL postseason record. "This might be the best game a quarterback has ever played", Giants coach Bill Parcells later said. Two of the most famous plays from the game were the flea flicker to McConkey, and the touchdown pass caught by McConkey off of the fingertips of Giants tight end, Mark Bavaro.  The Giants defeated the Broncos 38–20, and Simms was named MVP of Super Bowl XXI. He is credited for being the first to use the phrase "I'm going to Disney World!" following a championship victory.

Later career: 1987–1993
Simms performed well in the strike-shortened 1987 NFL season, finishing with the second highest quarterback rating in the NFC. He threw for 2,230 yards, 17 touchdowns, and 9 interceptions. He passed for 3,359 yards, 21 touchdowns, and 11 interceptions while completing 54.9% of his passes in the 1988 season. The Giants rebounded from a 6–9 record in 1987 to finish 10–6 but fell just short of the playoffs due to the NFL tie-breaker system. In 1989, the Giants started 8–1 and finished 12–4, Simms passed for 3,061 yards, 14 touchdowns, and 14 interceptions on 56.3% completion percentage. He performed consistently most of the season except for a two-game stretch against the Eagles and 49ers where he produced seven turnovers, six of which resulted in points for the opposition. He also struggled in the Giants' playoff game against the Los Angeles Rams, and the Giants lost 19–13. In 1990, Simms was having one of his finest seasons, leading the NFC with the highest quarterback rating (92.7) and the Giants to an 11–3 record. But his season was cut short due to a broken foot suffered in the Week 15 game against the Giants' eventual Super Bowl XXV opponent, the Buffalo Bills. The Giants would defeat the Bills 20–19 in the Super Bowl with Jeff Hostetler filling in at quarterback.

After the Giants' Super Bowl victory, Parcells resigned and was replaced by the team's running backs coach, Ray Handley. One of Handley's first decisions was to select Jeff Hostetler as the team's starting quarterback following his performance in Super Bowl XXV. Simms saw only spot action in two games prior to Week 13, when Hostetler broke his back in a game against the Tampa Bay Buccaneers. Simms finished the game and reclaimed the starting job, but won only once in his remaining four starts as the Giants failed to return to the playoffs at 8–8.

Simms was named starter for the 1992 season after beating out Hostetler for the job in preseason. Simms suffered a severe arm injury in a Week 4 loss to the Los Angeles Raiders and missed the remainder of the season. Between the 1991 and 1992 seasons, he amassed a combined 1,905 yards, 13 touchdowns, and 7 interceptions while completing 59.3% of his passes. The Giants finished the 1992 season at 6–10, which led to Handley's firing and the hiring of former Denver Broncos coach Dan Reeves. As part of an overall house cleaning, Reeves released Hostetler and named Simms his starting quarterback. Simms started all 16 games in 1993, being one of only seven quarterbacks to do so, and led the Giants to a resurgent 11–5 season including a victory over the Minnesota Vikings in the playoffs. He underwent shoulder surgery after the 1993 NFL season to repair a torn labrum. The surgery was successful, and team doctor Russell F. Warren's prognosis for recovery was excellent, and Simms was expected to be ready in time for training camp. However, later during that offseason, Simms was released by the Giants, and subsequently decided to retire. Upon his release, co-owner Wellington Mara called it "a day of overwhelming sadness.".

Simms considered playing for the Cardinals in 1994 and for the Browns in 1995, but eventually decided to stay retired.

In his 14 seasons with the Giants, Simms completed 2,576 out of 4,647 passes for 33,462 yards and 199 touchdowns. His career passing yardage total ranked him at 11th in NFL history at the time of his retirement. He added 349 carries for 1,252 rushing yards and 6 touchdowns on the ground. He set team records for most passes completed and attempted in one game (40 and 62, respectively), season (286, 533) and career (2,576, 4,647), most career touchdown passes (199) and most 300-yard games in a career (21). Simms still owns some of the New York Giants passing records, although Eli Manning has surpassed most of them: season passes (387 completed, 618 attempted), career completed passes (4,895), career touchdowns (366), career 300-yard games (53). Sports Illustrated considered Simms to be the "Most Underrated Quarterback" in NFL history in their August 27, 2001 issue entitled, "The Most Overrated and Underrated".

NFL career statistics

Regular season

Giants franchise records
's NFL off-season, Simms still held at least 13 Giants franchise records, including:
 Most Passing Yards (game): 513 (1985-10-13 @CIN)
 Most Passing Yards (game, as a rookie): 300 (1979-10-14 SFO)
 Most Intercepted (rookie season): 14 (1979; tied with Joe Pisarcik)
 Best Passer Rating (playoff season): 131.8 (1986)
 Best Passer Rating (playoff game): 150.9 (1987-01-25 DEN)
 Most Sacked (career): 477
 Most Sacked (season): 55 (1984)
 Most Sacked (game): 9 (1981-11-01 NYJ)
 Most Sacked (playoff game): 6 (1984-12-29 @SFO and 1986-01-05 @CHI; tied with Eli Manning)
 Most Sacked (rookie season): 39 (1979)
 Most Yds/Pass Att (game): 13.63 (1984-09-02 PHI)
 Most Yds/Pass Att (playoff game): 10.72 (1987-01-25 DEN)
 Most 300+ yard passing games (rookie season): 1

Post NFL career

On September 4, 1995, Simms' jersey was retired in a halftime ceremony of a game versus the Dallas Cowboys. During an emotional speech, Simms stated that he wanted to don his jersey one final time, and throw "one more pass" to teammate Lawrence Taylor. Simms later commented, "[a]ll of a sudden it kind of hit me, I've put Lawrence in a really tough spot; national TV, he's got dress shoes and a sports jacket on, and he's had a few beers and he's going to run down the field and I'm going to throw him a pass." Simms then motioned for Taylor to run a longer pattern, and after 30–40 yards, threw him the pass. Taylor later stated that the situation made him more nervous than any play of his career, "I'm saying to myself (as the pass is being thrown), 'If I drop this pass, I got to run my black ass all the way to Upper Saddle River because there ain't no way I'm going to be able to stay in that stadium'." Taylor caught the pass however, and the capacity crowd in attendance cheered in approval.

After his retirement as a player in 1994, Simms first joined ESPN then went on to join NBC's lead broadcast crew, teaming with Dick Enberg and Paul Maguire on that network's coverage of Super Bowl XXX and Super Bowl XXXII. Simms also announced Weightlifting at the 1996 Summer Olympics and served as a sideline reporter on the NBA on NBC for NBC Sports. In 1998, he moved to CBS with the AFC package, teaming first with Greg Gumbel (through the end of the 2003 season) and later with Jim Nantz on the CBS's lead broadcast team. He also worked with Armen Keteyian, Bonnie Bernstein and Lesley Visser. Since 2009 he has been a host of Inside the NFL on Showtime (another CBS holding) with James Brown and Cris Collinsworth. In 2017 he was replaced by Tony Romo as a color commentator and joined the CBS pregame show The NFL Today.

Simms was part of the commentary team, along with his broadcast partner Jim Nantz, in the Madden NFL 13, 25, 15, and 16 video games.

Outside of football broadcasting, Simms co-hosted the Miss Universe 2002 pageant with actress and model Daisy Fuentes. He made an appearance as himself on the CBS soap opera As the World Turns in 2007, and in February 2010 made an appearance on The Price Is Right (with Nantz) to present a Super Bowl XLIV showcase. In the same month, he appeared as himself (again with Nantz) on the How I Met Your Mother episode "Rabbit or Duck". On November 13, 2014, Simms appeared uncredited on the episode "Just a Regular Irregular" of the CBS television series Elementary. Simms's cameo was as a consultant to Sherlock Holmes in the art of knife throwing. Furthermore, Simms was forced to settle a debt with Holmes by loaning him a Super Bowl ring for the purpose of advancing the investigation.

Personal life
Simms and his wife, Diana, live in Franklin Lakes, New Jersey. They have three children: Chris, Deirdre, and Matt. His son-in-law is former NFL linebacker Brian Toal, who was schoolmates with Matt. Simms is fond of New Jersey, remarking in 1987: "I wasn't overjoyed about coming to New York. When I thought of New York, I thought of New York City. But out here, it's just like anywhere else."

In 2011, Simms was inducted into the Kentucky Pro Football Hall of Fame.

See also
 History of the New York Giants (1979–1993)
 List of 500-yard passing games in the National Football League

References
Notes

Bibliography

McConkey, Phil, Simms, Phil, and Schaap, Dick. Simms to McConkey: Blood, Sweat, and Gatorade, New York: Random House. 1987 
Neft, David S., Cohen, Richard M., and Korch, Rick. The Complete History of Professional Football from 1892 to the Present. New York: St. Martin's Press. 1994 
Pervin, Lawrence A. Football's New York Giants: A History. McFarland 2009 
Pooley, Eric. True Blue, New York, January 26, 1987 issue  (available online)
Schwartz, John. Tales from the New York Giants Sideline, Sports Publishing LLC, 2004 
Simms, Phil and Meier, Rick. Phil Simms On Passing, New York: William Morrow and Company, Inc. 1998 
Whittingham, Richard. What Giants They Were. Chicago: Triumph Books 2000 
Simms, Andrew Luck. "Luck doesn't make NFL Throws" Los Angeles, Huffington Post LLC November 3, 2011

External links

 
 

1954 births
Living people
American color commentators
American football quarterbacks
American sports studio analysts
American television sports announcers
College football announcers
Morehead State Eagles football players
National Basketball Association broadcasters
National Conference Pro Bowl players
National Football League announcers
National Football League players with retired numbers
New York Giants players
Notre Dame Fighting Irish football announcers
Olympic Games broadcasters
People from Franklin Lakes, New Jersey
People from Springfield, Kentucky
Players of American football from Louisville, Kentucky
Players of American football from New Jersey
Southern High School (Kentucky) alumni
Sportspeople from Bergen County, New Jersey
Sportspeople from Louisville, Kentucky
Super Bowl MVPs